Austroliotia saxa, is a species of sea snail, a marine gastropod mollusk in the family Liotiidae.

The database of Seashells of New South Wales considers this species a synonym of Austroliotia scalaris (Hedley, 1903) as the specimen, on which Laseron based its description of this species, was worn and had poorly developed spines and axial lamellae.

Description
The height and width of the shell attains 8 mm.

Distribution
This marine species occurs off New South Wales, Australia.

References

 Laseron, C. 1954. Revision of the Liotiidae of New South Wales. The Australian Zoologist 12(1): 1–25, figs 1-49a [2, figs 2-2a
 Iredale, T. & McMichael, D.F. (1962). A reference list of the marine Mollusca of New South Wales. Memoirs of the Australian Museum. 11 : 1–109
 Wilson, B. (1993). Australian Marine Shells. Prosobranch Gastropods. Kallaroo, WA : Odyssey Publishing. Vol.1 1st Edn pp. 1–408.

External links
  Australian Faunal Directory: Austroliotia darwinensis

saxa
Gastropods described in 1954